Samuel Johnson (born 25 July 1973 in Accra) is a former Ghanaian football midfielder.

Career
Johnson played for Kayserispor, Gaziantepspor and Fenerbahçe SK in Turkey, Anderlecht in Belgium and Kalamata in Greece.

Honours
Hearts of Oak

 Ghanaian FA Cup: 1993–94
Fenerbahçe
Süper Lig (1): 2000–01

References

External links 
 

1973 births
Living people
Footballers from Accra
Ghanaian footballers
Association football midfielders
Accra Hearts of Oak S.C. players
Kalamata F.C. players
R.S.C. Anderlecht players
Gaziantepspor footballers
Fenerbahçe S.K. footballers
Kayserispor footballers
Ghana Premier League players
Super League Greece players
Belgian Pro League players
Süper Lig players
Ghana international footballers
1994 African Cup of Nations players
1996 African Cup of Nations players
1998 African Cup of Nations players
2000 African Cup of Nations players
Ghanaian expatriate footballers
Ghanaian expatriate sportspeople in Belgium
Ghanaian expatriate sportspeople in Greece
Ghanaian expatriate sportspeople in Turkey
Expatriate footballers in Belgium
Expatriate footballers in Greece
Expatriate footballers in Turkey